Linfox is an Australian transport and logistics and supply chain business founded in 1956 by Lindsay Fox.

History

Linfox was established in 1956 by Lindsay Fox as Lindsay Fox Cartage with one truck in Melbourne. In 1958, a contract with Schweppes saw the fleet grow to ten trucks. In the early 60's Lindsay joined with BP to distribute heating oil in Melbourne thus doubling his fleet. By 1966, the fleet comprised over 60 trucks. In the 1970s it expanded into New South Wales and Queensland, operating over 1,000 vehicles by the end of the decade winning notable distribution and warehousing contracts with Coca-Cola, Coles and Woolworths.

In 1984 Linfox commenced operations in Asia with an operation in Shanghai and in 1989 commenced operating in New Zealand. In July 1987, 34% of the company was listed on the Australian Securities Exchange. Lindsay Fox purchased the shares back in 1988.

In 1995, Linfox commenced operations in the United Kingdom for BP. By the end of the 1990s, it operated 3,000 trucks. In 1997 Avalon Airport was purchased followed in 2001 by Essendon Airport.

In 2002, cash-in-transit transport company Armaguard was purchased from Mayne Group. In 2004, the Phillip Island Grand Prix Circuit was purchased followed in 2006 by rail freight forwarder FCL Interstate Transport Services.

In 2016, Linfox purchased a 14% shareholding in K&S Corporation, which, by January 2019, had jumped to 20%. In February 2019, after permission from the Federal Court, Aurizon, Queensland's intermodal container business was acquired by Linfox for A$7.3 million.

References

Airport operators
Companies based in Melbourne
Companies formerly listed on the Australian Securities Exchange
Logistics companies of Australia
Family-owned companies of Australia
Transport companies established in 1956
Transport companies of Australia
1956 establishments in Australia